Januarius and Pelagia ( ) were joint Christian martyrs and saints recorded in the Jerusalem Martyrology. They were beheaded or racked and torn with iron claws and pieces of earthware at Nicopolis in Armenia during the reign of the Roman emperor Licinius. Their feast day observed on July 11.

They are possibly to be considered identical with SS Januarius and Marinus who were martyred in the same place in the same year under identical circumstances with the martyrs Nabor and Felix; their feast day, however, was observed on July 10. Alternatively, the quartet may have been a combination of Januarius and Pelagia with the SS Nabor and Felix were martyred in Italy in the early 4th century.

See also
 Other saints Januarius
 Other saints Pelagia

Notes

References

Citations

Bibliography
 .
 

320 deaths
4th-century Christian martyrs